The rusty-shouldered ctenotus (Ctenotus rutilans)  is a species of skink found in Western Australia.

References

rutilans
Reptiles described in 1980
Taxa named by Glen Milton Storr